In molecular biology, the regulator of motility and amylovoran A (RmaA) gene is a bacterial non-coding RNA. It was discovered in genome-wide identification of Hfq binding sRNAs in plant pathogen Erwinia amylovora. Together with Hfq it positively controls motility and negatively controls  the production of acidic exopolysaccharide amylovoran  in E. amylovora.

References 

Non-coding RNA